Zosha Di Castri (born 1985) is a Canadian composer and pianist living and working in New York. She is the Francis Goelet Assistant Professor of Music at Columbia University. Her work came to international attention when a specially commissioned piece about the lunar landings opened the BBC Proms 2019.

Early life and education
Di Castri was born in Calgary, Alberta, and grew up in St. Albert. She completed her bachelor's of music in piano performance and composition at McGill University, and graduated from Columbia University with a Doctor of Musical Arts degree.

Career

Di Castri became an assistant professor of music at Columbia in 2014. In 2015 her work Dear Life was premiered by the National Arts Centre orchestra. Her work has also been performed by the San Francisco Symphony, New World Symphony, Toronto Symphony Orchestra, Orchestre Symphonique de Montreal, and the BBC Symphony Orchestra.

On 19 July 2019 her specially commissioned work Long is the Journey, Short is the Memory opened the BBC Proms 2019 with the BBC Symphony Orchestra and the BBC Singers conducted by Karina Canellakis. Reviewers praised the composition, and commented on Di Castri's skill as an orchestrator.

Di Castri's compositions are also performed by the JACK Quartet.

In 2019, Di Castri released a debut album of her compositions in performances by various ensembles and artists. 

In 2021, she received a Guggenheim Fellowship.

Selected works

 Anssi de suite… (2015) for solo cello
 AKKORD I (2012) for flute, piano, electronics, and kinetic sculpture installation
 Alba (2011) for orchestra
 The Animal After Whom Other Aninsls Are named (2013) for six singers and electronics
 The Contours of Absence (2018) for string octet (double quartet)
 Cortège (2010) for 13 musicians
 Dear Life (2015) for orchestra, soprano, and recorded narrator
 Dream Feed Origins (2020) for fixed media
 Dream Feed I. - ZD/Olivia (2021) for fixed media, violin, piano
 Dream Feed II. - ZD/Pauchi (2021) for fixed media, violin(s)/voice and processing, and piano
 Dream Feed III. - ZD/Alice (2021) for fixed media, voice/flute and processing, and piano
 Dream Feed IV. - ZD/Chloe (2021) for fixed media, cello and processing, and piano
 Dream Feed V. - ZD/Aiyum (2021) for fixed media, percussion, and piano
 Du haut de l’Orillon (2007, revised 2008) for clarinet and electronics
 DUX (2017) for solo piano
 Escapement (2009) for oboe, saxophone, percussion, piano, and accordion
 Everything Too Big To Take Apart (2012) for tape and interactive wii controller, for dance
 Four Miniatures for Woodwind Quintet (2009, revised 2010) for woodwind quintet
 how many bodies have we to pass through (2017, revised 2019) for solo percussion
 Hunger (2018) for orchestra, improvised drummer, and silent film
 In the Half-light (2022) for Orchestra, commissioned for the Toronto Symphony Orchestra
 La forma dello spazio (2010) for chamber ensemble
 L’allée d’ardoise (2009) for 12 musicians
 Lineage (2013)
 Listen to Low (2010) for tape
 Long is the Journey, Short is the Memory (2019) for Orchestra & Chorus, commissioned for the [BBC Proms] 2019
 Manif (2013) for percussion quartet
 Near Mute Force (2016) for 2 voices, viola, piano, drum set plus auxiliary percussion
 Pamplecaribou (2013) for amplified flute, piano, cello, and tape
 Patina (2016) for solo violin
 Phonobellow (2015) for 5 instrumentalists, electronics and interactive sound sculpture, co-composed with David Adamcyk
 The Phonograph (2014) for baritone, violin, and cello
 Phonophotographie (2012) for 15 musicians
 Serafiniana (2014) for orchestra, amplified solo violin, amplified harp, and electronics
 Sprung Testament (2018) for piano and violin
 Strange Matter (2011) for 8 musicians
 String Quartet No 1 (2016)
 sulla mappa concava del buio (2010) for string quartet, soprano, and electronics
 Tachitipo (2016) for two pianists, two percussionists, and electronics
 The Thinking Eye (2006) for solo piano
 Wake, Butterfly (2015) for 12 musicians
 Work and Day (2012) for percussion duo

References

External links
Profile on the Columbia University website

Living people
21st-century Canadian composers
Jules Léger Prize for New Chamber Music winners
1985 births
21st-century classical composers
Canadian classical composers
Women classical composers
21st-century women composers
Canadian women composers
21st-century Canadian women musicians